Group C of the 2022 African Nations Championship, consisting of Morocco, Sudan, Madagascar and Ghana, began on 15 January and will end on 23 January 2023.

Teams

Standings

Matches

Morocco vs Sudan

Madagascar vs Ghana

Morocco vs Madagascar

Ghana vs Sudan

Ghana vs Morocco

Sudan vs Madagascar

Discipline
Fair play points would have been used as tiebreakers if the overall and head-to-head records of teams were tied. These were calculated based on yellow and red cards received in all group matches as follows:
first yellow card: −1 point;
indirect red card (second yellow card): −3 points;
direct red card: −4 points;
yellow card and direct red card: −5 points;

Only one of the above deductions was applied to a player in a single match.

Notes

References

External links

2022 African Nations Championship